This is a list of U.S. metropolitan areas by their gross domestic product per capita.


GDP per capita for US metropolitan statistical areas (in 2021 dollars)

See also

 List of U.S. states by economic growth rate
List of U.S. metropolitan areas by GDP

References

External links 

 United States Government
 United States Census Bureau
 2010 United States Census
 USCB population estimates
 United States Office of Management and Budget

Metropolitan areas by GDP per capita

Lists of cities by GDP
Metropolitan areas by GDP per capita
Metropolitan areas by GDP per capita